Ladybug Ladybug is a 1963 American docudrama film directed by Frank Perry and written by Eleanor Perry. The film is a commentary on the psychological effects of the Cold War, the title deriving from the classic nursery rhyme. It marked the film debuts of William Daniels, Estelle Parsons and Jane Connell.

The film was inspired by a McCall's magazine story about an actual incident at a California elementary school during the 1962 Cuban Missile Crisis.

Plot
One morning, teachers at a secluded countryside elementary school are asked to accompany the pupils to their homes after a nuclear attack warning alarm sounds and the staff are unable to determine whether or not the alarm was false. One teacher and the children under her care walk through the countryside, with a slowly building sense of doom about what they believe to be the upcoming nuclear holocaust. Several of the children reach their homes; one girl cowers under a bed after her parents refuse to take the threat seriously, a boy leads his dementia-ridden grandmother to take cover in their basement, another girl runs off in a panic after finding her house empty.

When several of the children finally gain access to a bomb shelter, they do not allow a female fellow student to join them, claiming there is not enough room. The girl frantically searches for shelter and hides inside an old abandoned refrigerator; she is not seen again and her fate is never explained. A boy leaves the shelter to try and find her, and as he runs along outside a loud whining noise is suddenly heard overhead. The boy cowers in the shadow of planes passing in the sky above and repeatedly yells "Stop!" as the camera moves closer to his face, goes out of focus and then fades to black.

Cast (partial)
Jane Connell as Mrs. Maxton
William Daniels as Mr. Calkins
James Frawley as Truck Driver
Richard Hamilton as JoAnn's Father
Kathryn Hays as Mrs. Forbes
Judith Lowry as Luke's Grandmother
Nancy Marchand as Mrs. Andrews
Estelle Parsons as JoAnn's Mother
Miles Chapin as Joel
Alice Playten as Harriet

See also
List of American films of 1963

References

External links 
 Ladybug Ladybug at IMDb
 Ladybug Ladybug at AllMovie
 

1963 films
1963 drama films
1960s American films

1960s English-language films
1960s thriller drama films
American black-and-white films
American thriller drama films
Cold War films
Films about children
Films about nuclear war and weapons
Films about the Cuban Missile Crisis
Films based on newspaper and magazine articles
Films directed by Frank Perry
Films set in schools
Films shot in Pennsylvania
United Artists films